Newport Classical, previously known as Newport Music Festival, is an annual chamber music-oriented music festival and year-round classical music arts organization in Newport, Rhode Island, which began in July 1969. The festival consists of dozens of concerts each year, held in a variety of historic sites around town. The festival has hosted over 2,500 concerts featuring nearly 150 artists making their American debuts. The year-round programming includes a Chamber Series, with performances held at the Newport Classical Recital Hall, and Community Concerts, held in green spaces around Aquidneck Island.

History

Early years 

In 1966, the Newport Metropolitan Opera Festival was incorporated. According to George Wein, legendary founder of both the Newport Jazz and Folk Festivals, The Newport Metropolitan Opera Foundation was dissolved to create the non-profit Rhode Island Arts Foundation at Newport Inc. in 1968. Glenn Sauls, who had worked at the Metropolitan Opera with Rudolf Bing, was hired as the first General Director and programmed the first summer season in 1969, with the full panoply of the performing arts, including; chamber music, ballet, film, vocal ensembles, and a full-scale performance of The Barber of Seville.

In 1971, year three of the Festival, Mr. Sauls noted,

You can well imagine how gratifying it is for those of us who have worked so hard to launch the Newport Music Festival in the face of formidable difficulties to now begin to detect a sense of permanence, and to have had our efforts as handsomely acknowledged as they recently were by Harold Schoenberg, the distinguished music critic of the New York Times. He wrote recently of the Newport Festival, “Serious musicians return season after season because they find much to admire in a forgotten repertory ignored by the Establishment. They love to play it, audiences love to hear it. There is no more relaxed, unusual and, in its own way, enterprising festival anywhere.

The Festival's partnership with the Preservation Society of Newport County realized the possibility of performing chamber music in the historic Newport Mansions, the kind of grand rooms for which that music had originally been written.

Mark Malkovich III 

In 1975, Mark Malkovich III became the festival's General Director. Under his leadership, the Festival became world-renowned for presenting young international artists in their North American debuts, for providing a showcase for emerging American artists, and performing rare repertoire. As described by Richard Dyer,

The repertory that Mark chose for Newport was astounding in its extent, range, and variety. Over the years the Festival has presented the complete keyboard music and chamber music of every major composer from Bach through the mid-20th century, as well as an interesting sampling of music written since then. Mark placed familiar masterpieces alongside neglected works by the same composers; most programs were full of illuminating juxtapositions…

The Newport Festival became celebrated for the prestige of its debut artists; during Mr. Malkovich’s tenure more than 120 artists made their US debuts. Italian pianists Andrea Lucchesini and Pietro De Maria, French violinists Augustin Dumay and Raphael Oleg, and pianists Jean-Phillipe Collard, François-René Duchâble and Alain Jacquon all had their American debuts at the Newport Music Festival.

Mr. Malkovich's untimely passing in 2010 ended a remarkable career, curating 36 consecutive seasons and leading the Festival to prominence both here at home and around the globe.

Mark Malkovich IV 

In 2008, Mark Malkovich IV, assumed the title of General Manager and was later conferred leadership of the organization following his father's passing. The younger Malkovich shared his father's passion and brought his own vision to the organization. While still devoted to the Romantic era, the Festival began to feature a broader range of musical periods. Bach to Bernstein and new works by both established and emerging composers, became part of the repertoire, as well as discoveries of forgotten minor masterpieces. Examples include the world premiere of a four-hand Andante Cantabile by Claude Debussy, found in a manuscript at the Pierpont Morgan Library in New York, and an unknown Prelude of Rachmaninoff, found at the Library of Congress in Washington.

Malkovich and his mother, Joan Malkovich, retired from the festival after the 2017 season. Pamela A. Pantos became the new executive director. 

The 50th anniversary season (July 4–22, 2018) featured a broadening of the festival's musical landscape — celebrating the anniversaries of Rossini, Debussy and Bernstein — and included works by living composers. The festival continued to honor its legacy by presenting the Mark P. Malkovich III Memorial Concert, the highly regarded French Opera Night and three Sunrise Concerts at the Chinese Tea House. It also renewed its pledge to the local community and visitors to Newport by presenting free public concerts and strengthening its commitment to local artists and music programs.

Today 
On November 22, 2020, the board of directors of the Newport Music Festival appointed Gillian Friedman Fox as the organization's new executive director. During her recent and much-celebrated tenure at the Dallas Symphony Orchestra, Fox received critical acclaim for curating innovative and thought-provoking classical music performances and programs. Fox will usher in a new era for the festival as it enters its 53rd season in 2021.

On October 8, 2021, the organization went through a name change and rebranding, following an extensive audit by Sametz Blackstone Associates. Moving forward the organization will be known as Newport Classical, better reflecting the current mission of looking toward the future and celebrating the diversity of expression within the art form through year-round programming.

On March 29, 2022, the organization announced programming for the 2022 Newport Classical Music Festival, running from July 1 - 17 with 24 concerts featuring 32 guest artists and ensembles at 11 venues. The 2023 Festival will run from July 4 - 23, 2023.

Festival lineups
Notable past performers at the Newport Music Festival include:
 1976: Andrei Gavrilov (American Debut)
 1979: The Swingle Singers, Bella Davidovich (American Debut)
 1982: Dimitris Sgouros (American Debut)
 1989: Pascal Roge, Bert Lucarelli, Eric Ruske, Paul Plishka, Ben Holt
 1997: Valery Afanassiev (American Debut)
2018: Joshua Bell, Jake Heggie, Frederica Von Stade, Yaekwon Sunwoo, Imani Winds, Sergey Antonov, Ilya Kazantsev, Charlie Albright, Hermitage Piano Trio, 
 2019: The Swingle Singers, Sierra Boggess, Marc-André Hamelin, Charlie Albright,
 2021: A Far Cry, Harlem Quartet, Third Coast Percussion, Aaron Diehl, Boston Trio, Lara Downes, Sergey Antonov & Ilya Kazantsev, Lara Deutsch & Rupert Boyd, Chanticleer, Brooklyn Rider, Anthony McGill
 2022: Orpheus Chamber Orchestra with Chad Hoopes, Gavilán Brothers and a World Premiere by Shawn Okpebholo, Johannes Moser & Marc-André Hamelin, The King’s Singers, Sō Percussion, Joyce Yang, Junction Trio, Spektral Quartet, and more!

References

External links
 

Music festivals in Rhode Island
Classical music festivals in the United States
Chamber music festivals
Tourist attractions in Newport, Rhode Island
Music festivals established in 1969
Performing arts in Rhode Island
1969 establishments in Rhode Island